Burrangong Shire was a local government area in the South West Slopes region of New South Wales, Australia.

Burrangong Shire was proclaimed on 7 March 1906. The Council offices were located in Young, but the shire did not include Young.

The shire was amalgamated with the Municipality of Young to form Young Shire on 1 July 1980.

References

Further reading

Former local government areas of New South Wales
1906 establishments in Australia
1980 disestablishments in Australia